Teri Garr is an American actress who has appeared in over 70 films since beginning her career in the mid-1960s. She began her film career as a dancer in various musicals before having small speaking roles in Head (1968) and  Changes (1969). In 1974, she was cast as Inga in Mel Brooks's comedy horror film Young Frankenstein (1974), and also had a supporting role in Francis Ford Coppola's thriller The Conversation (1974).

In 1977, Garr starred in Steven Spielberg's science fiction film Close Encounters of the Third Kind, and she gained critical acclaim for her performance in the Sydney Pollack-directed comedy Tootsie (1982), for which she was nominated for an Academy Award for Best Supporting Actress. She subsequently had supporting roles in the comedy Mr. Mom (1983), and two Robert Altman films: The Player (1992), and Prêt-à-Porter (1994). Garr subsequently had small roles in the comedies Dumb and Dumber (1994), Dick (1999) and Ghost World (2001) before going into semi-retirement due to her diagnosis with multiple sclerosis.

Film

Television

Video games

References

American filmographies
Actress filmographies